Daniel Simmons Jr. is a Neo-African abstract expressionist painter, a published author, poet and philanthropist. He is a leader in the art world with his philanthropic ventures, artistic talents and creative mind and drive. Danny Simmons played an instrumental role in the conceiving of and co-producing the hit HBO show Def Poetry Jam, and won a Tony Award for the Broadway version of the show.  Danny is the older brother of hip-hop impresario Russell Simmons and rapper Joseph Simmons ("Reverend Run" of Run–D.M.C.). He is the co-founder and chairman of Rush Philanthropic Arts Foundation, which provides disadvantaged urban youth with arts access and education.

Simmons is co-founder, along with his siblings, Russell, and Joseph “Rev Run” Simmons, of the Rush Philanthropic Arts Foundation, and founder of Rush Arts Philadelphia and RAP Gallery II, a new solo exhibition/arts education gallery that opened in 2019. He is a former board member of the Brooklyn Museum, the Brooklyn Public Library, the New York Foundation for the Arts, the National Conference of Artists and former Chairman for the NYS Council on the Arts.

Along with his brother Russell, Simmons established Def Poetry Jam, which has enjoyed long-running success on HBO.  In 2004, Simmons published Three Days As the Crow Flies, a fictional account of the 1980s New York art scene. He has also written a book of artwork and poetry called I Dreamed My People Were Calling But I Couldn't Find My Way Home. He has also published Deep in Your Best Reflection and The Brown Beatnik Tomes, two additional volumes of poetry.

In 2015 Simmons moved to Philadelphia and opened Rush Arts Philadelphia gallery (RAP) to further the Rush Arts mission and to begin to create a national presence for the service organization. In 2016, he opened Rush Arts Philadelphia and RAP Gallery II, a new solo exhibition/arts education gallery that opened in 2019.

Today, his works appear in Brooklyn Academy of Music, Brooklyn Museum, Chase Manhattan Bank, Deutsche Bank, Schomburg Center for Black Culture, The Smithsonian, United Nations, and, on an international scope has shown work in France, Amsterdam and Ghana. In 2019, he was appointed to Philadelphia Museum of Art's African American Collections Committee.

Danny Simmons holds a Bachelor’s degree in social work from New York University, a Masters in public finance from Long Island University, and is the recipient of an honorary PhD from Long Island University.

Early life 

Simmons is the son of Daniel Simmons Sr., a truant officer and black history professor who also wrote poetry, and Evelyn Simmons, a teacher who painted as a hobby. Simmons grew up in Hollis, Queens. He earned a degree in social work from New York University and a master's in public finance from Long Island University Brooklyn. He began painting after he realized how much he hated his job with the Bureau of Child Support. In 2012 he received an honorary PhD in fine arts from Long Island University Brooklyn.

Art work 

Simmons, an abstract expressionist painter, has had his work shown nationally. Chase Manhattan Bank, Brooklyn Academy of Music, Deutsche Bank, the United Nations, and the Schomburg Center for Black Culture all show his work as part of their collections.  On an international scope has shown work in France, Amsterdam and Ghana. The Brooklyn museum, as well as the Smithsonian African American Museum, have featured his work. His paintings can often be seen in his published books of poetry. He is also an avid collector of African art and comic books.

In 2019, he was appointed to Philadelphia Museum of Art's African American Collections Committee.

Def Poetry Jam 

Danny Simmons played an instrumental role in the conceiving of and co-producing the hit HBO show Def Poetry Jam, and won a Tony Award for the Broadway version of the show.   Simmons is the co-executive producer of Russell Simmons' Def Poetry. Def Poetry of which episodes were produced for HBO from 2002 to 2007. Simmons came up with the idea for the series when a group of Simmons's friends would gather and perform open mic nights at art galleries in the early 1990s. The poets did shows at the Nuyorican, Danny's home, and an art gallery in Manhattan. Simmons then asked his younger brother Russell about extending the "Def Jam" name in a new direction. After many more live events and showcases Danny and his associates Stan Lathan, Bruce George and Bob Sumner managed to launch "Def Poetry Jam" as both a cable show and a Broadway play.

Bibliography 

 "I Dreamed My people were calling but couldn't find my way home:
'85: A Graphic Novel
 Three Days As the Crow Flies: A Novel
 I Dreamed My People Were Calling But I Couldn't Find My Way Home
 The Brown Beatnik Tomes
 Deep in Your Best Reflection: Poems in 160 Characters
The Return of Two Dick Willie

See also

 List of artists from Brooklyn

References 

20th-century American painters
American male painters
21st-century American painters
21st-century American male artists
Place of birth missing (living people)
Year of birth missing (living people)
Living people
New York University School of Social Work alumni
Long Island University alumni
People from Hollis, Queens
20th-century African-American painters
21st-century African-American artists
20th-century American male artists